Henry Smith (July 22, 1838 – September 16, 1916 in Milwaukee, Wisconsin) was a millwright, architect, builder and politician who was elected a member of the United States House of Representatives from Wisconsin from 1887 - 1889 as a member of the Union Labor Party. He also served as a Socialist member of the Wisconsin State Assembly in 1878. At different times, Smith ran for office (unsuccessfully or successfully) on the Socialist, Greenback, Democratic and Union Labor tickets.

Early life and career
Smith was born in Baltimore, Maryland; moved with his parents to Massillon, Ohio, and then in 1844, moved to Milwaukee in the Wisconsin Territory. He attended the Milwaukee public schools, and from the age of 13 until he was 17 apprenticed as a bookbinder. His brother taught him the millwright trade in which he worked until he entered politics.

Political office 
He served as a member of the Milwaukee Common Council from 1868–1872. In the 1877 election, Smith was elected to the State Assembly from Milwaukee County's Sixth District (sixth and thirteenth wards of Milwaukee) as a Socialist, with 618 votes to 381 for Democrat Charles Fashel and 381 for Greenback Jacob Olberman. He served only one term, being defeated in the 1878 election, in which he ran on the Greenback ticket, but received only 253 votes, to 488 for Democrat Alonzo H. Richards and 716 for Republican Christopher Raesser. In 1880 he ran for the Assembly from the Fifth Milwaukee County district on the Democratic ticket against incumbent Isaac Van Schaick, receiving 3778 votes to Van Schaick's 5678.

Smith was again elected a member of the Common Council 1880-1882; served as city comptroller 1882-1884; and again on the Common Council from 1884-1887.

Congress and after
In 1886, Smith was elected as a Union Labor Party candidate to the Fiftieth Congress (March 4, 1887 – March 3, 1889), with 13,355 votes to 9645 for Republican Thomas H. Brown (Republican incumbent Isaac Van Schaick was not a candidate for re-election), 8233 for Democrat John Black (former mayor of Milwaukee) and 187 for Prohibitionist Z. C. Trask. He was elected as the representative of Wisconsin's 4th congressional district.

In 1888, Republican former incumbent Van Schaick defeated Smith for election to the Fifty-first Congress, receiving 22,212 votes to 20,685 for Smith (running on the Democratic and Labor tickets), 527 for Socialist John Schuler and 302 for Prohibitionist George Heckendorn.

Smith worked as an architect and builder. He was once again elected a member of the Common Council in 1898 and served until his death in Milwaukee on September 16, 1916. His remains were cremated and the ashes interred in Union Cemetery. His papers are in the collection of the Wisconsin Historical Society.

Footnotes

External links

19th-century American architects
Democratic Party members of the United States House of Representatives from Wisconsin
Democratic Party members of the Wisconsin State Assembly
Millwrights
American builders
1838 births
1916 deaths
Architects from Baltimore
Politicians from Milwaukee
Milwaukee Common Council members
Wisconsin socialists
Wisconsin Laborites
Wisconsin Greenbacks
Labor Party members of the United States House of Representatives
19th-century American politicians